Ballina is an electoral district of the Legislative Assembly in the Australian state of New South Wales.

History
Ballina was originally created in 1894, when the three-member electorate of Richmond was divided into Richmond, Lismore and Ballina.  In 1904, Ballina was replaced by  Byron.  In 1988, a recreated Ballina and Murwillumbah replaced Byron.

The 2004 redistribution of electoral districts estimated that the electoral district would have 47,246 electors on 29 April 2007.  At the 2007 election it encompassed all of Ballina Shire (including Ballina, Alstonville, Lennox Head and Wollongbar) and most of the populated areas of Byron Shire (including Byron Bay, Mullumbimby, Ocean Shores, Suffolk Park, Brunswick Heads, South Golden Beach and Bangalow).

The 2013 NSW state electoral redistribution once again changed the boundaries of the electorate, so at the next election it would comprise the entire shires of Ballina and Byron.

The  won the seat of Ballina at the 2015 state election, bringing their lower house representation to three seats. It became the first rural seat in any Australian parliament outside Tasmania to be won by the Greens.

Members for Ballina

Election results

References

External links
 

Electoral districts of New South Wales
Ballina, New South Wales
Ballina Shire
Byron Bay, New South Wales
1894 establishments in Australia
Constituencies established in 1894
1904 disestablishments in Australia
Constituencies disestablished in 1904
1988 establishments in Australia
Constituencies established in 1988